American Pie is a film series consisting of four sex comedy films. American Pie, the first film in the series, was released by Universal Pictures in 1999. The film became a worldwide pop culture phenomenon and gained a cult following among young people. Following American Pie, the second and third films in the series, American Pie 2 (2001) and American Wedding (2003), were released; the fourth, American Reunion, was released in 2012. A spin-off film series entitled American Pie Presents consists of five direct-to-video films that were released from 2005 to 2020.

Throughout the first film in the original series, Jim Levenstein (Jason Biggs) tries to develop a relationship with his school classmate Nadia (Shannon Elizabeth). Jim and three of his best friends, Kevin Myers (Thomas Ian Nicholas), Paul Finch (Eddie Kaye Thomas), and Chris Ostreicher (Chris Klein), make a pact to lose their virginity before their high school graduation. Steve Stifler (Seann William Scott), the obnoxious jock of the group, provides them with unorthodox advice while hosting wild parties in the meantime. In the second film, the five boys host a summer party and Jim becomes interested in his friend, Michelle Flaherty (Alyson Hannigan). In the third film, Jim and Michelle plan to marry, although the forced invitation of Stifler could ruin everything. In the fourth film, the group gets back together in anticipation of their 13th high school reunion. The spin-off series revolves around relatives of Stifler, including his brother Matt (Tad Hilgenbrink); his cousins Erik (John White), Dwight (Steve Talley), Scott (John Patrick Jordan), and Stephanie (Lizze Broadway); and their respective friends.

The original production produced on a total budget of US$145 million, has grossed nearly a billion worldwide. The spin-off films were released direct-to-video. The original series has received mixed reviews from critics, while the spin-off series has received negative reviews.

Cast

Principal cast

Additional crew

Production

Development
In the original American Pie (1999), Jim Levenstein and his friends Kevin Myers, Paul Finch, and Chris Ostreicher attempt to lose their virginity before their high school graduation. Jim pursues Czech exchange student Nadia, but his attempts fail after he ejaculates prematurely twice during foreplay, and instead pursues band geek Michelle, asking her to the prom. At Stifler's prom after-party, Jim has a one-night stand with Michelle, and the rest of the friends lose their virginity as well.

In American Pie 2 (2001), Jim and his friends organize a party at a summer beach house in Grand Harbor reuniting the high school gang. Nadia returns, and Jim asks Michelle to help him finally have sex with her. Jim ends up realizing he is in love with Michelle (whose feelings are mutual), and goes to a recital where she is performing to reveal this to her.

American Wedding (2003) begins with Jim proposing to Michelle. Finch, Kevin, and Stifler help the arranging of his marriage.

In the years that have passed since American Wedding, the most recent installment American Reunion (2012) shows Jim and Michelle married with a child, and Kevin has gotten married himself, whereas Oz and Heather grew apart, Finch still has not found love (not counting Stifler's mom), and Stifler has not come to terms with the fact that his teenage years are long gone. Now these lifelong friends have come home as adults for their thirteenth high school class reunion, to reminisce about – and get inspired by – the hormonal teens they once were.

The film series began with American Pie, released on July 9, 1999. This was followed by three sequels: American Pie 2, released on August 10, 2001, American Wedding, released on August 1, 2003, and American Reunion, released on April 6, 2012.

Future
A fifth theatrical film, under the working title American Pie 5, was in consideration in 2012, as the fourth film had done well internationally and Universal had secured a production deal with Hurwitz and Schlossberg. In August 2017, Seann William Scott said in an interview that the fourth film probably had not made enough at the domestic box office to warrant another film. In August 2018, Tara Reid said she met with the directors, with them saying that the fifth film will happen, and that filming could begin soon. In March 2021, Reid further elaborated that both the script is written, and that "it’s one of the best ones" in the series. A few months later, Jason Biggs denied the fact regarding script developments, but said that there were always ideas for a sequel, albeit having many obstacles.

Spin-off series

Additional crew

Production

Development
American Pie Presents: Band Camp (2005) follows Stifler's younger brother Matt Stifler (Tad Hilgenbrink), who is forced to attend band camp for the summer. While there, he realizes he must change his arrogant ways in order to win over Elyse.

American Pie Presents: The Naked Mile (2006) follows Erik Stifler (John White), the only Stifler to possibly graduate from high school a virgin. After a failed attempt at sex with his girlfriend Tracy (Jessy Schram), she gives Erik a free pass to go to the University of Michigan, where his cousin Dwight (Steve Talley) attends, to lose his virginity. In the process, Erik's loyalty is put to the test.

American Pie Presents: Beta House (2007) continues a year after The Naked Mile. Erik has now graduated from high school, has lost his girlfriend to her previous boyfriend, and is starting college. He must complete a series of tasks before he can join Dwight's fraternity and also begins a new relationship with Ashley Thomas (Meghan Heffern), a girl he met in the co-ed bathrooms in their dorm.

American Pie Presents: The Book of Love (2009) takes place ten years after American Pie. Set in East Great Falls, a fire in the school's library results in the destruction of the Book of Love (the "Bible" from the first film). With the help of the book's creator, Mr. Levenstein, the people who started the fire set out to restore the book and lose their virginity.

American Pie Presents: Girls' Rules (2020) follows a group of four teenage girls who make a pact to get what they want before their prom and end up falling in love with the same guy.

More than six years after the release of the original American Pie, the franchise continued with a direct-to-video spin-off Presents series; consisting of Band Camp, released on December 26, 2005, The Naked Mile, released on December 12, 2006, Beta House, released on December 26, 2007, The Book of Love, released on December 22, 2009, and Girls' Rules, released on October 6, 2020. All five spin-offs center around relatives of Steve Stifler, who include his brother Matt and his cousins Erik, Dwight, Scott and Stephanie Stifler.

Several films set in the American Pie continuity were released. The films featured mostly new characters. Aside from the raunchy humor, the common elements among the American Pie Presents films are the continued presence of Jim's Dad and members of the Stifler clan. Other than Jim's Dad, the only other returning characters are Matt Stifler, who takes center stage for the first spin-off, albeit played by a new actor, and Chuck Sherman, who is the guidance counselor for East Great Falls High School in the first spin-off.

Reception

Box office performance

Critical and public response

Home media

DVD release
 
Blu-ray

References

External links

 

 
American film series
Film series introduced in 1999
Comedy franchises